Mons Bassouamina (born 28 May 1998) is a professional footballer who plays as a forward for  club Pau. Born in France, he plays for the Congo national team.

Club career
In January 2019, Bassouamina was loaned to Boulogne from Nancy.

In June 2022, Bassouamina signed for Ligue 2 side Pau.

International career
Born in France, Bassouamina is of Congolese descent. He is a youth international for France. He was called up to represent the Congo national team for a set of friendlies in March 2022. He debuted with the Congo in a friendly 3–1 loss to Zambia on 25 March 2022.

References

External links
 
 
 

1998 births
Living people
People from Gonesse
Footballers from Val-d'Oise
Republic of the Congo footballers
Republic of the Congo international footballers
French footballers
France youth international footballers
Black French sportspeople
French sportspeople of Republic of the Congo descent
Association football forwards
AS Nancy Lorraine players
US Boulogne players
FC Bastia-Borgo players
Pau FC players
Ligue 2 players
Championnat National players
Championnat National 3 players